Last Post is a ceremonial musical call.

Last Post or The Last Post may also refer to:

 Last Post (poem), a 2009 poem by Carol Ann Duffy
 Last Post (novel), a 1928 novel by Ford Madox Ford
 Last Post, a 2008 novel by Robert Barnard
 The Last Post (film), a 1929 British silent film
 The Last Post (short film), a 2001 short film about the Falkland War
 The Last Post (album), a 2007 album by Carbon/Silicon
 The Last Post (TV series), a 2017 BBC TV series about British involvement in North Yemen Civil War and the Aden Emergency
 The Last Post (podcast), offshoot of The Bugle and co-production with Somethin' Else